HMS H29 was a British H class submarine built by Vickers Limited, Barrow-in-Furness. She was laid down on 19 March 1917 and was commissioned on 14 September 1918.

HMS H29 was sunk during trials at Devonport Dockyard following a recent refit on 9 August 1926. Five civilians and one crewman died. H29 was raised and sold in Pembroke Dock on 7 October 1927.

Design

H29 was fitted with an anti-aircraft gun and four  torpedo tubes. Its torpedo tubes were fitted to the bows and the submarine was loaded with eight  torpedoes. It is a Holland 602 type submarine but was designed to meet Royal Navy specifications. Its complement was twenty-two crew members.

References

Bibliography
 
 
 

British H-class submarines
Ships built in Barrow-in-Furness
1918 ships
World War I submarines of the United Kingdom
Royal Navy ship names
Maritime incidents in 1926